"Good as Gold" is a song recorded by Japanese-American singer-songwriter Ai, released March 23, 2022, by EMI Records. Written by Rogét Chahayed, Lindy Robbins, Taylor Dexter and Ai, the song served as the fourth single from Ai's extended play, It's All Me, Vol. 1.

In Japan, "Good as Gold" was used in commercial advertisements for Lux.

Background and release 

In 2019, Ai traveled to her hometown, Los Angeles, California to record material for a new album. While in California, Ai worked with Lindy Robbins to write "Good as Gold". Robbins and Ai also worked with producers Rogét Chahayed and Taylor Dexter to write the song. Regarding production of the song, Chahayed stated he recorded the piano first before the lyrics of the song were complete. Robbins commented, "It's wonderful to write music that bridges countries and has a positive message".

"Good as Gold" was released with no prior announcement. Universal Japan announced the song would serve as a commercial tie-in for Lux in Japan.

Live performances 
A video of Ai singing "Good as Gold" in a recording studio was released to YouTube in July 2020 as part of a studio session series.

Track listing 
Digital download and streaming

 "Good as Gold"  — 3:20

Personnel 
Credits adapted from Tidal and official album profile.

 Ai Uemura – songwriting, production, lead vocals
 Lindy Robbins – songwriting
 Rogét Chahayed – songwriting, production, piano
 Taylor Dexter – songwriting, production
 Randy Merrill – mastering

Release history

References 

2020 singles
2020 songs
Ai (singer) songs
Songs written by Lindy Robbins
Songs written by Ai (singer)
EMI Records singles
Universal Music Japan singles
Song recordings produced by Ai (singer)
Songs written by Rogét Chahayed